Castel Condino (Castèl Condìn in local dialect) or "The Cheen Castle", is a comune (municipality) in Trentino in the northern Italian region Trentino-Alto Adige/Südtirol, located about  southwest of Trento.

Castel Condino borders the following municipalities: Daone, Bersone, Pieve di Bono, Condino, Prezzo, and Cimego.

Demographic evolution

References

External links
 Homepage of the city

Cities and towns in Trentino-Alto Adige/Südtirol